Tyn may refer to:

Places
 Tyń, Poland 
 Týn nad Bečvou, Moravia, Czech Republic
 Týn nad Vltavou, Czech Bohemia
 Tyn-y-Gongl, Anglesey, Wales 
 Horšovský Týn, Czech Republic

Other uses
 Church of Our Lady before Týn, a church in Prague
 14537 Týn nad Vltavou, a comet

See also
TYN (disambiguation)
Town, with the same etymology as Czech týn